Bahdinan prisoners is used to refer to the arrest of a group of four journalists and an activist in the Bahdinan area of Kurdistan Region. The term only became used when the group were convicted of spying by the KDP on the 16th of February 2021. The term was used by the speaker of parliament Rewaz Faeq to refer to the trial whilst the president of the current government Necirvan Barzani only referred to the case "punished Bahdinis". The best known journalist amongst them is Sherwan Sherwani whom CPJ has highlighted his case before the trial.  Sherwani was editor-in-chief of Bashur (in Bahdini) magazine, was arrested in the early hours of October 7th 2020 at home in Sabiran (village outside Erbil).

Conviction 
The trial was a two day session at Hewler Court of Crimes. According to Ali Hamasaleh who was at the trial, the group were accused of having collaborated on a Facebook Messenger chat group exchanging information which the KDP authorities say were "spying" for foreign powers. The group of five are:

 Sherwan Amin Sherwani
 Ayas Akram
 Guhdar Mohammed Zebari
 Hariwan Issa
 Shivan Saeed Berozhky

Backlash 
The trial comes at a time when the region itself is going through protests against corruption and cutting public servant salaries by the Kurdish government. The CPJ as well as other organisations have release statements denouncing the sentence and the process. The US consulate in Erbil (Kurdistan Region capital) where the trial took place also released a statement. The internal pressure is known even from Barzani family with the press release by Necirvan Barzani.

References 

Kurdistan Region (Iraq)